Francisco de Zamudio y Avendaño, O.S.A. (7 January 1570 – 27 April 1639) was a Roman Catholic prelate who served as Bishop of Nueva Caceres (1628–1639).

Biography
Francisco de Zamudio y Avendaño was born in Portilla on 7 January 1570 and ordained a priest in the Order of Saint Augustine.
On 10 July 1628, he was appointed during the papacy of Pope Urban VIII as Bishop of Nueva Caceres.
On 29 June 1629, he was consecrated bishop. 
He served as Bishop of Nueva Caceres until his death on 10 July 1639.

References

External links and additional sources
 (for Chronology of Bishops) 
 (for Chronology of Bishops) 

17th-century Roman Catholic bishops in the Philippines
Bishops appointed by Pope Urban VIII
1570 births
1639 deaths
Augustinian bishops
People from the Province of Cuenca
Roman Catholic bishops of Cáceres